Braies are a type of trouser worn by Celtic and Germanic tribes in antiquity and by Europeans subsequently into the Middle Ages. In the later middle ages they were used exclusively as undergarments.  Braies  generally hung to the knees or mid-calf, resembling what are today called shorts.  They were made of leather, wool, or, in later years, cotton or linen. They were adopted by the Romans as braccae.

References

Undergarments
Medieval European costume